Anzhou may refer to:

Anzhou Subdistrict, a subdistrict in Xianju County, Zhejiang, China
Anzhou, Hebei, a town in Anxin County, Hebei, China

Historical prefectures
An Prefecture, a prefecture between the 6th and 12th centuries in modern Hubei, China
An Prefecture (Guangxi), a prefecture in the 6th century in modern Guangxi, China

See also
Yên Châu (Vietnamese equivalent)